Akbarabad-e Rah Niz (also Romanized as Akbarābād-e Rāh Nīz; also known as Akbarābād) is a village in Balvard Rural District, in the Central District of Sirjan County, Kerman Province, Iran. At the 2006 census, its population was 31, in 7 families.

References 

Populated places in Sirjan County